"Appropriation (By Any Other Name)" is a 7-inch single and CD release by Sheffield band the Long Blondes. It was released on June 13, 2005 on Angular Records. The song is a homage to Hitchcock's 1958 film Vertigo. it has been said that this song is told from the point of view of Judy, due to lines such as "When I met you, I never wore dresses like that" and "You can't have me, make me act the same".

Lead singer Kate Jackson painted two different portraits for the CD single and 7-inch single. They both depicted Kim Novak's characters Madeleine Elster and Judy Barton. The song was not featured on their debut album Someone to Drive You Home, but the b-side, Lust In The Movies was. Both were featured on the compilation album "Singles". The song was well received by critics.

Track listing
All lyrics written by Dorian Cox and Kate Jackson, music by the Long Blondes.

7-inch single
 Side A "Appropriation (By Any Other Name)"
 Side B "Lust In The Movies"

CD
 "Appropriation (By Any Other Name)"
 "My Heart Is Out Of Bounds"
 "Lust In The Movies"

References 

2005 singles
The Long Blondes songs
2005 songs
Songs written by Kate Jackson (singer)
Songs written by Dorian Cox
Angular Recording Corporation singles